Century Rayon High School, Shahad is a school located in the Thane district of Mumbai Metropolis, India.

About
Century Rayon High School is a co-educational school managed by Century Textile and Industries and affiliated to maharashtra state board. It was established in 1958. The School has classes from Junior KG to X (SSC) and has three medium viz. English, Hindi & Marathi. The school is located near Century Rayon Colony.

Co-curricular activities
Century Rayon High School also have a large playground. The school has a physics labs, chemistry labs, Interactive Learning Class rooms, Audio Visual Rooms and biology labs. It also has a computer lab. Sports club are some of the included activities round the year. It has a library with a wide range of more than 12000 books. In 18 August 2013, around 1000 students from Century Rayon High School participated for planting saplings in the city, the programme was known as Vriksha Dindi programme.

Silver Jubilee
On 18 December 2011, the year of the Silver Jubilee of the school, the 1986 batch of students that joined the school in its Silver Jubilee, held their "golden reunion"—the first reunion of its kind by any batch of the school. 

Dr Meenakshi Choudhary, one of the alumni of this school and a leading world expert in the field of reproductive medicine  also attended this silver jubilee reunion celebrations from the U.K.

See also
 List of schools in Mumbai

References

External links
 Century Rayon High School

1958 establishments in Bombay State
Educational institutions established in 1958
Schools in Thane district